Wu Sing-yung （Wu Xing-Yong, Chinese： 吴兴镛； 1939 - ）is a Chinese-American medical professor and historian.

Early life 
He was born in Sichuan. Wu earned a bachelor's degree(1963) from Taiwan University, a Ph.D.(1969) from University of Washington and a M.D.(1972) from Johns Hopkins University. He completed his post-graduate medical education at the Universities of Chicago, Washington (Seattle) and California Los Angeles.

Career 
He settled at the University of California, Irvine, and was promoted to full professor in Radiological Sciences and Medicine in 1990.

His research and clinical interest were in thyroid hormone metabolism and the management of thyroid diseases. He authored, edited and contributed to medical books and over a hundred peer-reviewed medical papers. He has had a long-term interest in the research on the development of a novel fetal thyroid function marker (W-compound) that may help to better management of congenital hypothyroidism. His Thyroid Laboratory at Long Beach VA Medical Center, in collaboration with professors Delbert A. Fisher at Harbor-UCLA Medical Center and Theo Visser at Erasmus Medical Center of Netherlands, has found that sulfo-conjugation is the major pathway for thyroid hormone metabolism in the mammalian fetus.

In addition to medical studies, Wu has an interest in modern Chinese history. He was the author and editor of five books in Chinese and one book in English (Father's Gold Secret, 2021) about the facts involving the “secret gold shipments” from Shanghai to Taiwan in 1948-49 near the end of the Chinese Civil War. These events were of critical importance on the Republic of China retreat to Taiwan. According to his studies, about 4 million oz. gold and some one hundred million pieces of silver dollars were transferred from Shanghai's state treasury in multiple shipments by air and sea to Taiwan and Xiamen from December 1, 1948, to May 18, 1949.  The major portion of the gold (80% or 6.28 million oz.) had originally been sent from the United States during and after WWII as part of US aid to China to fight inflation. Nearly all the silver dollars and one million oz of gold in Xiamen were used to support the Nationalist army in contending against the rapid advancing People's Liberation Army (PLA) from April to December 1949 when inflation had flooded the area under the Nationalist control and rendered the paper money worthless.

The rest of the gold, near 3 million oz., played a pivotal role in stabilizing the economy of the Nationalist regime (Republic of China) in Taiwan from 1949 to 1950 until the outbreak of the Korean War on June 25, 1950. Without the gold from the Chinese Mainland, Taiwan would certainly have been destabilized by a precipitate currency devaluation, which would have invited a PLA invasion across the Taiwan Strait, leading to its unification with the People's Republic of China in 1950 -51.

Wu married Dr. Yvonne Yan-chiu Yu in 1982. Yu graduated from Guangzhou Medical University in 1978 and received a DNP degree from Brandman University (Irvine) in 2013. She currently serves as an adjunct assistant professor at UCLA and a clinical director at Alignment Healthcare in Orange. They have two daughters, Elizabeth and Elaine.

Selected works

References 

1939 births
Living people
Chinese medical writers
American medical researchers
Chinese medical researchers
Republic of China historians
20th-century American historians
Johns Hopkins University alumni
National Taiwan University alumni
University of Washington alumni
University of California faculty
Johns Hopkins School of Medicine alumni
University of Washington School of Medicine alumni
University of Chicago alumni
Pritzker School of Medicine alumni
University of California, Los Angeles alumni
University of California, Irvine faculty